Dehlaq may refer to:
 Dehlaq, Famenin, Hamadan Province
 Dehlaq, Malayer, Hamadan Province
 Dehlaq, Kermanshah
 Dehlaq, Markazi